was a Japanese actor, voice actor and narrator who was born in Nakatsu, Oita, Japan as . He was part of Aoni Production at the time of his death, but he established Gin Production in 1997. He was most known for the roles of Hemu-Hemu (Nintama Rantarō) and Ginnosuke Nohara (Crayon Shin-chan).

On August 25, 2001, he died from acute subarachnoid hemorrhage, aged 49.

His final roles were Captain Smoker in One Piece, Biff in s-CRY-ed and Taizo Kotobuki in Super GALS!.

Successors
Keiichi Sonobe – (Dragon Ball Kai as Farmer)
Mahito Ōba – (One Piece as Captain Smoker)
Bin Shimada – (Nintama Rantarō as Hemu-Hemu), (s-CRY-ed as Biff in episode 22)
Fumihiko Tachiki – (Super GALS! as Taizo Kotobuki, Ghost in the Shell 2.0 as Old Man)
Chō – (Crayon Shin-chan as Ginnosuke Nohara, s-CRY-ed Alteration as Biff)
Takumi Yamazaki – (Kinnikuman Nisei as Seiuchin)
Nobuaki Kanemitsu – (Ojamajo Doremi as Alexander T. Oyajide)
Katsumi Suzuki – (InuYasha as Kagome's grandfather, New Century Brave Wars as Chieftain)
Yasuhiro Mamiya – (Super Robot Wars 30 as Cheiftain)
Hisao Egawa – (Nintama Rantarō as Narukane Tochidaemon)
Chafurin – (the PSP version of Tengai Makyō: Daiyon no Mokushiroku as Chief Bull)
Naoki Tatsuta (Umeboshi Denka & Doraemon: Papparopan's SuperPappa! as Gonsuke)
Shinpachi Tsuji – (SD Gundam G Generation Spirits as Jinn Gehenam)
Tetsu Inada – (SD Gundam G Generation Over World as Broom Brooks)
Koichi Yamadera – (Anpanman as Tamagoyakikarou, Yuzujiiya)
Daiki Nakamura – (Anpanman as Yuzujiiya)

Voices roles
Akuma-kun as Palbados
Art of Fighting as Jack Turner
Billy Inu Nandemo Shokai as Daichi-Sensei; Doga
Biriken as Doka
Brave Police J-Decker as Chieftain
Crayon Shin-chan as Ginnosuke Nohara
Cutey Honey Flash as Danbei
Digimon Adventure as TonosamaGekomon
Digimon Adventure 02 as TonosamaGekomon
Digimon Tamers: Battle of Adventurers as Wataru Urazoe
Doraemon: Nobita's Adventure in Clockwork City as Hokuro
Dragon Ball Z as Farmer (ep 1)
Eden's Bowy as Gilgamesh; Oltron
El Hazard as King
Escaflowne: The Movie as Kio; Ruhm
Ghost in the Shell as Old man
Gigantor FX as Elvis brothers
Harbor Light Monogatari – Fashion Lala Yori as Big guy
InuYasha as Grandpa Higurashi, Buyo
Jigoku Sensei Nube as Masaru Kaneda
Jungle Emperor Leo: Hon-o-ji as Tommy
Kindaichi Shōnen no Jikenbo as manager (ep 74); Tokuichi Genbu
Kinkyuu Hasshin Saver Kids as Omega
Kinnikuman Nisei movie as Seiuchin
Lost Universe as Weapons dealer (ep 10)
Macross 7 the Movie: The Galaxy's Calling Me! as Miguel
Magic User's Club as Master (ep 4)
Mahou Tsukai Sally 2 as Spirit of Insect
Manmaru the Ninja Penguin as Borot
Mobile Fighter G Gundam as Queen The Spade
Mobile Suit Gundam 0083: Stardust Memory as Alloys Mozley
Mobile Suit Victory Gundam as Jinn Gehennam
Neo Ranga as Yoshiyuki Takesue
Nintama Rantarō as Hemu Hemu
Ojamajo Doremi as Alexander T. Oyajiide
One Piece as Captain Smoker
Porco Rosso
Red Baron as Doctor Asimov
s-CRY-ed as Biff
Sailor Moon S as Vice Principal (ep 97)
Sakigake!! Otokojuku as Edogawa
Street Fighter II: The Movie as Dee Jay
Super GALS! Kotobuki Ran as Taizo Kotobuki
Sword for Truth as Kagairo
Virtua Fighter as Yan Weimin, Yan Honron
Tenchi Muyo Movie 2: Daughter of Darkness
Thomas and the Magic Railroad (Japanese dub) as Diesel 10
Vision of Escaflowne as Kyo; Rum; Sorcerer
Wicked City as Airport Demon
Yume no Crayon Oukoku as Tofumon

Other Japanese
Pinocchio's Daring Journey (Captain Doc)

References

External links

1951 births
2001 deaths
Aoni Production voice actors
Deaths from subarachnoid hemorrhage
Japanese male musical theatre actors
Japanese male stage actors
Japanese male video game actors
Japanese male voice actors
Male voice actors from Ōita Prefecture
People from Nakatsu, Ōita
20th-century Japanese male singers
20th-century Japanese singers